Atriplex species are used as food plants by the larvae of some Lepidoptera species, including:

Monophagous species which feed exclusively on Atriplex

Coleophora — case-bearers:
C. crassicornella (feeds on A. halimus)
C. moeniacella (feeds on A. vestita)
C. plurifoliella (feeds on A. halimus)
C. serinipennella
C. vestianella

Polyphagous species which feed on Atriplex among other plants

Blood-vein (Timandra griseata)
Chrysoesthia drurella
Coleophora — case-bearers:
C. adspersella
C. annulatella
C. atriplicis
C. parthenica (recorded on A. halimus)
C. salinella
C. saxicolella
C. sternipennella
C. versurella (recorded on A. littoralis)
Nutmeg moth — (Discestra trifolii)
Mojave sootywing — (Hesperopsis libya)

See also

External links

Lepidoptera
Atriplex